West Bottom is an unincorporated community in Fluvanna County, in the U.S. state of Virginia.  West Bottom has historically been an African American community.

References

Unincorporated communities in Virginia
Unincorporated communities in Fluvanna County, Virginia